The  is a Japanese government commission charged with the protection of personal information. It was established on January 1, 2016 to replaces the Specific Personal Information Protection Commission. The commission consisted of eight commissioners and a chairperson appointed by the Prime Minister with the consent of the National Diet. The number of commission members was increased from the initial four to eight in February 2016.

References

External links
 Official website 

Government agencies of Japan